Shiva Puja in Hinduism is the way by which one worships Lord Shiva through traditional and ancient rites with the use of mantra, tantra, yantra, kriyas, mudras, and abhishekam.

Introduction
In popular Hinduism, Shiva is often represented as a destructive aspect of Brahman and entitled 'The Destroyer.' This is merely one attribute, as there are many different groups and sects who hold Shiva, or any of his different forms and associated Deities, as the Supreme Being and attribute different titles to him. Popular Puja may take an eclectic or North Indian style, whereas more specific sects or castes may have their own specific forms. General worship of Shiva is quite diverse and can range from worshipping an anthropomorphic murti (Such as the famous Tamil Nataraja statues from the ancient Chola Kingdom), a Lingam (one of Shiva's main symbols), a deified landmark (such as the Ganges or Mount Kailash) or not worshipping a symbol at all (as in the case of the Lingayats).

Puja in the Puranas
The Puranas are a collection of texts describing the feats of various Gods and Figures from Hindu Cosmology. The texts are organized by their focus on one of the major Devas and explore the feats and legends of those Gods. Among the most important attributed to Shiva is the Shiva Purana, which describes in various stories the mythological origins of puja implements and taboos. An example might be not offering Magnolia champaca and Pandanus odorifer flowers to Shiva, each given a justification grounded in an episode from mythology.

Abhishekam
Shiva Abhishekam is usually performed to a Lingam, representing his manifestation as a creator of good (by destroying evil). In many temples, there is a vessel hung over the Lingam called thaara paathra that continuously drips water or other offerings onto the Lingam in deference to Shiva's desire for Abhisheka. Some of the common items used for Shiva Abhisheka are:

 Curd
 Milk/water
 Honey
 Tender/young Coconut
 Vibhuti (holy ash)
 Panchamruta (Curd based delicacy consisting of Panch(5) items: Milk, Sugar, Ghee (clarified butter), Honey, curd)
 Bananas
 Sandalwood Paste
 Ghee (Clarified butter)
 Haldi
 Fragrant oils
 Bael leaves (vital importance): While selecting BAEL leaves, make sure the Chakra and the Bajra should not there. The Chakra is a white mark made by the insects on the BAEL leaves, while the Bajra is the thick portion towards the stalk. The BAEL leaves used in pooja should be of 3 leaflets even if one of the leaves gets detached from three leaves, then it is of no use.
 Flowers - AAKAMDA Flowers, DHATURA Flowers, BLUE LOTUS (or Pink Lotus/White Lotus) Flowers are auspicious.

8 Flowers That Please Lord Shiva:
 Ahimsa prathamam pushpam Non-violence is the First Flower
 Pushpam Indriya Nigraham Control of the senses is the Second Flower
 Sarva Bhootha Daya Pushpam Being Kind towards all the living beings is the Third Flower
 Kshama Pushpam Visheshataha Forgiving is the real special Flower – the Fourth Offering
 Shanthi Pushpam Peace is the Fifth Flower
 Tapah Pushpam Penance is the Sixth Flower
 Dhyanah Pushpam Meditation is the Seventh Flower
 Sathyam Ashta Vidha Pushpam Truth is the Eighth Flower

 Milk, curd or Panchamrit should never be poured in utensil made of Bronze, as this is equal to wine
 Fingers should not be put in water, milk and ghee etc., because the touching of nails makes these things inauspicious.

Since Shiva is said to wear Nageshwara (Snake God) as an ornament around his neck, it is said that the fragrance of Aloe (which attracts snakes) is also a very holy item to be used for the worship of Shiva.

In contrast, it said that Lord Vishnu is Alankara Priyar (Desirous of ornamentation). Hence Vishnu Sthalas (places of worship of Lord Vishnu) have elaborately carved idols of Lord Vishnu with the alankaram (decoration ceremony) post the abhishekam, being a very elaborate ritual.

In any discussion of Hinduism, it is important to remember that these rituals are an offshoot of the interpretation of Vedas, the holy text of Hindus. These texts by themselves do not outline the deities or rituals for their worship thereof.

Kindly Note:-(AVOID - Ketaki flower, Tulsi patar (leaves) and Chempaka flower)

Champaka, also known as Golden Champa or Yellow Champak, is not used in the worship of Lord Shiva. There is an interesting story in the Shiv Purana which explains the reason why Champaka flowers are not used in Shiva Puja. On the way to Shiva Temple in Gokarna stood a beautiful Champaka tree full of flowers. Sage Narada, once on his way to temple, noticed this tree and admired it. Suddenly he found a Brahmin priest nearby. He came to pluck the flowers, but on seeing Sage Narada, he refrained from doing it. When enquired by Sage Narada, the Brahmin said that he was on his way to a nearby village and just stood there enjoying the Champaka tree.

After Narada left for the temple, the Brahmin plucked the flowers in a basket and hid them.
On return from the temple, Sage Narada again met the Brahmin and this time, he said that he was going home. But suspicious about this behavior, Sage Narada went and asked the Champaka tree did anyone pluck its flowers. The Champa tree said no. But still, Sage Narada had his doubts, so he went back to the temple and found that the Shivling was covered with Champaka flowers.

Sage Narada asked a man who was meditating nearby as to who offered these flowers to Lord Shiva. The man said that an evil Brahmin daily comes and showers the Shivling with Champa flowers. Lord Shiva is pleased with this act, and due to His blessings, the Brahmin has become very powerful in the King's court and now harasses poor people. The Sage Narada went to Lord Shiva and asked why he was helping the bad man. Shiva said that I could not deny a devotee who worships me with Champaka flowers. Sage Narada went back to the Champaka tree and cursed it for lying to him. He said that the Champa flowers would never be accepted in the worship of Lord Shiva. He also cursed the evil Brahmin to be born as a demon and will attain only moksha when Lord Ram kills him.

Ketaki, known as umbrella tree or screw pine or keura in Hindi, is barred from the worship of Lord Shiva. It is not offered during pujas and worship as it is cursed by Lord Shiva. There is an interesting story mentioned in the Tamasic Shiva Purana that explains why Ketaki Flower is forbidden. Once, Lord Brahma and Lord Vishnu got into a fight over who was supreme. To sort out the issue, Lord Shiva made His first appearance in the form of Jyotirlinga or Lingodabhavamurti (a column of fire with no end or beginning) before Lord Vishnu and Lord Brahma. Lord Shiva intervened in the fight and said whoever could find out the origin or end of the Shivling was superior.

Lord Brahma and Vishnu set off to explore the beginning and end of the mighty column of light. Vishnu went down in the form of a boar, and Lord Brahma went up in the form of a swan. Lord Vishnu was unable to find the base and came up and admitted defeat. Brahma, on his journey upwards, came across a Ketaki flower. Brahma again went up but was unable to find the uppermost limits. So He decided to take the help of the Ketaki flower. Brahma decided to take the Ketaki flower back to Vishnu to bear witness that he had reached the top of the pillar of light. Brahma said he found the Ketaki flower atop the Jyotirlinga, and ketaki supported it. This lie infuriated Shiva. Brahma was cursed for telling lies, and He would not be worshipped on earth by people. Similarly, ketaki was also cursed that she would never again be used in the worship of Shiva. Thus, ketaki is debarred forever from pujas and worship of Lord Shiva.

Shiva Slokas

The most important prayers to invoke and please God Shiva are done on Pradosha, the thirteenth day of every fortnight in the Hindu calendar, and on Maha Shivaratri, according to Shaivism. 
Herein the most powerful and popular Shiva Slokas are as below:

The Mahamrityunjaya Mantra reads (IAST transliteration):

    tryambakaṃ yajāmahe sugandhiṃ puṣṭi-vardhanam
    urvāruk miva bandhanān mṛtyor mukṣīya māmṛtāt

In the translation of Arthur Berriedale Keith (1914):

"OM. We worship and adore you, O three-eyed one, O Shiva. You are sweet gladness, the fragrance of life, who nourishes us, restores our health, and causes us to thrive. As, in due time, the stem of the cucumber weakens, and the gourd is freed from the vine, so free us from attachment and death, and do not withhold immortality."

The Panchakshara Stotra with Om:

"Om Namah Shivaya"

English translation of this mantra:

"I honor the divinity within myself."
"May the elements of this creation abide in me in perfection?"
"May the greatest that can be in this world be created in me, in others and in this world."
"I bow to Lord Shiva."

Lingashtakam
Sri Lingashtakam is a popular 8-canto hymn chanted during the worship of Lord Shiva. The lyrics are as below,

Brahma Muraari Suraarchita Lingam

Nirmala Bhashita Shobhita Lingam

Janmaja Dukha Vinaashaka Lingam

Tat Pranamaami Sadaa Shiva Lingam

Meaning: I bow before that Sada Shiva Linga, which is adored by Brahma, Vishnu and other Gods, which is praised by pure and holy speeches and which destroys the cycle of births and deaths.

Devamuni Pravaraarchita Lingam

Kaamadaham Karunaakara Lingam

Raavana Darpa Vinaashaka Lingam

Tat Pranamaami Sada Shiva Lingam

Meaning: I bow before that Sada Shiva Linga, which is the destroyer of desires, which the Devas and the sages worship, which is infinitely compassionate and which subdued the pride of Raavana.

Sarva Sugandha Sulepitha Lingam

Buddhi Vivardhana Kaarana Lingam

Siddha Suraasura Vanditha Lingam

Tat Pranamaami Sadaa Shiva Lingam

Meaning: I bow before that Sada Shiva Linga, which is lavishly smeared with variegated perfumes and scents, which elevates the power of thought and enkindles the light of discrimination, and before which the Siddhas and Suras and Asuras prostrate.

Kanaka Mahaamani Bhushitha Lingam

Phanipathi Veshtitha Shobhitha Lingam

Daksha Su yagy Vinaashaka Lingam

Tat Pranamaami Sadaa Shiva Lingam

Meaning: I bow before that Sada Shiva Linga, the destroyer of Dakshas sacrifice, which is decorated with various ornaments, studded with different gems and rubies and which glows with the garland of the serpent Lord coiled around it.

Kumkuma Chandana Lepitha Lingam

Pankaja Haara Sushobhitha Lingam

Sanchitha Paapa Vinaashaka Lingam

Tat Pranamaami Sadaa Shiva Lingam

Meaning: I bow before that Sada Shiva Linga, which is smeared with saffron and sandal paste, which is decorated with lotus garlands and which wipes out all accumulated sins.

Devaganaarchitha Sevitha Lingam

Bhaavair Bhakti Bhirevacha Lingam

Dinakara Koti Prabhakara Lingam

Tat Pranamaami Sadaa Shiva Lingam

Meaning: I bow before that Sada Shiva Linga, which is worshipped by the multitude of Gods with genuine thoughts full of faith and devotion and whose splendor is like that of a million suns.

Ashta Dalopari Veshtitha Lingam

Sarva Samudbhava Kaarana Lingam

Ashta Daridra Vinaashaka Lingam

Tat Pranamaami Sadaa Shiva Lingam

Meaning: I bow before that Sada Shiva Linga, destroyer of all poverty and misery in its eight aspects, which is the cause of all creation and which stands on the eight-petalled Lotus.

Suraguru Suravara Pujitha Lingam

Suravana Pushpa Sadaarchitha Lingam

Paraatparam Paramatmaka Lingam

Tat Pranamaami Sadaa Shiva Lingam

Meaning: I bow before that Sada Shiva Linga, which is the Transcendent Being and the Supreme Self, worshipped by all Suras and their preceptor (Brhaspathi), with innumerable flowers from the celestial gardens.

See also
Puja in Buddhism, Jainism, and Hinduism.
Aum Namah Sivaya, Shiva Mantra
Shri Rudram, a Vedic chant on the early manifestation of Shiva as Rudra
Kapalika, a sect of Saivites who worship Shiva in His Bhairava form
History of Evolution of Saivism
Saivism
Aghori
Hindu views on God and gender

References

Further reading
Shiva Puja Beginner, Swami Satyananda Saraswati, Devi Mandir, 2001.
Shiva Puja and Advanced Yajna, Swami Satyananda Saraswati, Devi Mandir, 1998.

External links
Shiva Puja audio classes
Shiva Sankalpa Stotram
lingashtakam
Why Ketaki Flower is not offered to Lord Shiva?

Hindu philosophical concepts